"Such a Lonely One" is a single by Canadian country music group Prairie Oyster. Released in 1994, it was the first single from their album Only One Moon. The song reached #1 on the RPM Country Tracks chart in June 1994.

Chart performance

Year-end charts

References

1994 singles
Prairie Oyster songs
1994 songs
Arista Records singles